WHC Gjorche Petrov  is a female handball club based in Skopje, the capital of North Macedonia.

History 

The club was founded in 1979 under the name Women's Handball Club Gjorče Petrov. Kometal Gjorče Petrov stopped its work on 16 September 2011 when the central committee decided that there was no conditions for operation and existence. After a while the club started to work again.It was shut for couple of years but it started working again, without its brand-mark Kometal. Now it works under its original name WHC Gjorche and competes in Macedonian women's First League of Handball.

Kometal Days
For a decade the team played in the Macedonian National league, starting from lower ranks step by step year by year reaching the top division.
In the beginning of the 90s local Businessmen Trifun Kostovski took over the club. He invested good amount of money on bringing new players. After making the good team he moved the club to bigger arena "Kale". He invested in renovation of the arena expending and preparing it for the European scene . Year after year each season better and better players joined the club. The team started winning the Championship and the since next year 1994 they dominated in the cup too. Since 1992, it had won 17 national championships 16 national cups. 
European Champions League 
Kometal played in the EHF Women's Champions League for 14 seasons in a row. Each new season was better than the previous. Reaching the 1/4 finals almost every season and many times the 1/2 finals.
They were finalists in 2000 and 2005, and won the Champions Trophy once in 2002. At one time, it was the most popular sports team in the country, having its own anthem song by Macedonian musicians and entertainers.
The club finally won the EHF Champions League back in 2002 when they defeated Champions League Ferencvárosi TC.
 Post Kometal days
The club had to start again from the lower ranks of the national championship. For several seasons they played in the lower rank, and then moved to the higher divisions. Finally getting back where they belong in the First Division. Last few seasons they started ending in the top 5 five. In the last season they are in the play-offs fighting for the Crown again. This season they've reached the Cup's F4 winning the 1/2 final. After winning the semifinals they had to face WHC Metalurg in the final and try to win a Trophy after 13 years. They've lost the final match to Metalurg 27–30 in a tight game.
 Champions Again 2022 
After unfortunate loss at the Cup Final to Metalurg Gjorche Petrov team focused on finale games of the Championship play-off. First they've beat former champions Kumanovo away in surprise superior game 22–27.Then in last match they had their revenge against cup holder Metalurg at home again dominating the Metalists winning 25–19. After 13 years new generation of Gjorche Petrov brings the 18th Championship Trophy in their vendor collection.

European Glory Days Arena

SRC Kale -Sports and Recreation Center is a multi-functional indoor sports arena. Kale means Fortress Citadel, named after the Skopje's Fortress, located right next to the hall. The capacity of the hall is 4.300 spectators.

Hall is also known as "Macedonian handball fortress".
The hall is mainly used for handball, although it is suitable for matches in others sports: boxing, wrestling, basketball, volleyball, and music concerts.

 Kometal G.P Important matches played in SRC Kale
 Finals in the Women's EHF Champions League – Kometal Gjorce Petrov (2000 – Hypo, 2002 – Herz, 2005 – Slagelse)
 Women Handball Super Cup - 2002

Accomplishments 
Macedonian 
 Championship of Macedonia:
  (18): 1993, 1994, 1995, 1996, 1997, 1998, 1999, 2000, 2001, 2002, 2003, 2004, 2005, 2006, 2007, 2008, 2009, 2022
 Macedonian Cup:
 (16): 1993, 1995, 1996, 1997, 1998, 1999, 2000, 2001, 2002, 2003, 2004, 2005, 2006, 2007, 2008, 2009
European 
Champions League:
  (1): 2002
  (2): 2000 and 2005
1/4 Finalist (4):1997,1998,2004,2006
1/8 Finalist (5):1994,1996,2007,2008,2009
 Champions Trophy:
  (1): 2002
  (1) : 2004

Team  
Squad for the 2022–23 season

Technical staff
  Head Coach: Sime Simevski

Notable players

  Eduarda Amorim
  Ana Carolina Amorim
  Mirjeta Bajramoska
  Dušica Gjorgjievska
  Elena Gjorgjievska
  Lenče Ilkova
  Dragica Kresoja
  Oksana Maslova
  Nataša Mladenovska
  Savica Mrkik
  Gonca Nahcıvanlı
  Simona Nikolovska
  Alegra Oholanga
  Dragana Pecevska
  Julija Portjanko-Nikolić
  Marija Sterjova
  Iva Stojkovska
  Veselinka Trenoska
  Klara Boeva
  Indira Kastratović-Jakupović
  Gordana Naceva
  Andrijana Budimir
  Olga Buyanova
  Natalija Todorovska
  Valentina Radulović
  Luminița Dinu
  Narcisa Lecușanu
  Yeliz Özel
  Tatjana Medved
  Anzela Platon
  Mileva Velkova

References

External links
EHF Profile 
Fan Club Forum 

Handball clubs in North Macedonia
Sport in Skopje
Handball clubs established in 1979
Defunct handball clubs
1979 establishments in the Socialist Republic of Macedonia